Kevin Burns (June 18, 1955September 27, 2020), was an American television and film producer, director, and screenwriter. His work can be seen on A&E, National Geographic Channel, E!, Animal Planet, AMC, Bravo, WE tv, Travel Channel, Lifetime, and The History Channel. Burns created and executive-produced more than 800 hours of television programming.

Biography

Early life
Born on June 18, 1955, Burns grew up in Niskayuna, New York.  Raised Roman Catholic, he graduated from St. Helen’s School before attending Niskayuna High School. In 1977, he graduated cum laude from Hamilton College. In 1981, he received both a master's degree in film from Boston University's College of Communication and a Student Academy Award from  The Academy of Motion Picture Arts and Sciences for his first film, I Remember Barbra, a humorous documentary short that profiled Barbra Streisand's impact on her former Brooklyn, New York neighborhood. After graduation, Burns taught film production at the university, as well as heading the school's "Film Unit", a group that allowed students to gain real-world experience by producing commercials, public service announcements, documentaries, and other projects for clients. In 1988, he moved to Los Angeles, where he began working as an executive at 20th Century Fox Television.

Career
While at Fox, Burns co-founded Foxstar Productions, the production unit responsible for creating a series of Alien Nation movies for television. In 1994, while serving as senior vice-president of Foxstar, he founded Van Ness Films, a non-fiction and documentary production unit. That same year, he met Jon Jashni, a Fox film executive who shared his interest in the works of legendary Hollywood producer Irwin Allen.

In 1999, Burns officially made a transition from his role as a studio executive to that of a full-time producer.  While still under a production deal at Fox Television Studios, Burns and Jon Jashni formed Synthesis Entertainment and began developing and producing remakes and sequels of the Allen properties, most notably a Fox Television pilot for an updated version of The Time Tunnel (2002) and the feature film versions of Poseidon (2006) and Voyage to the Bottom of the Sea.

In 1999, Burns also created Prometheus Entertainment, a company specializing in documentary, reality, and non-fiction programming and specials. Here, Burns continued to produce and direct a wide variety of programming, including the reality show The Girls Next Door on E! (about the adventures of Playboy founder Hugh Hefner's three live-in girlfriends), High Maintenance 90210, Hollywood Science for the National Geographic Channel, Food Paradise and Bridget's Sexiest Beaches (both for the Travel Channel) along with Kendra and Holly's World, both spin-offs of The Girls Next Door.

In 2002, Burns received his first of two Emmy Awards as executive producer for A&E's Biography series. That same year, he was selected by George Lucas and Lucasfilm to produce and direct the 150-minute documentary feature Empire of Dreams: The Story of the Star Wars Trilogy.  Four years later, he was again selected by Lucas to produce and direct Star Wars: The Legacy Revealed, a feature-length documentary that premiered on The History Channel and went on to earn three Emmy Award nominations.  Other specials include Look, Up in the Sky: The Amazing Story of Superman, which Burns co-produced with Superman Returns director Bryan Singer; Spider-Man Tech; Indiana Jones and the Ultimate Quest; Batman Unmasked; Batman Tech; The Valkyrie Legacy, his second co-production with Bryan Singer; and Angels & Demons: Decoded in 2009.

Since 2010, Burns and his company Prometheus Entertainment have produced The History Channel TV series Ancient Aliens, America's Book of Secrets, and The Curse of Oak Island, as well as the reality TV series Kendra on Top for WEtv, and other non-fiction series and specials.

Along with his business partner Jon Jashni, Burns played an integral part in the development and creation of the Lost in Space reboot for Netflix and was serving as executive producer on the show.

Death
Burns died on September 27, 2020, of cardiac arrest at Cedars-Sinai Medical Center in Los Angeles, California.

Awards and nominations
Primetime Emmy Awards
Nominated: Outstanding Cultural Music-Dance Program, Rodgers & Hammerstein: The Sound of Movies (1996)
Won: Outstanding Non-Fiction Series (Informational), Biography (2002)
Nominated: Outstanding Nonfiction Series, Biography (TV Series) (2006)
Nominated: Outstanding Writing for Nonfiction Programming, Star Wars: The Legacy Revealed (2007)
Nominated: Outstanding Nonfiction Special, Star Wars: The Legacy Revealed (2007)
Nominated: Outstanding Nonfiction Series, Biography (TV Series) (2007)
Nominated: Outstanding Directing for Nonfiction Programming, Star Wars: The Legacy Revealed (2007)

Daytime Emmy Awards
Won: Outstanding Special Class Special, Hollywood Rocks the Movies: The 1970s (2003)

DVD Exclusive Awards
Nominated: Best New, Enhanced or Reconstructed Movie Scenes, Marilyn Monroe: The Final Days (2001)
Won: Best Original Retrospective Documentary, *Cleopatra: The Film That Changed Hollywood (2001)
Won: Best Behind the Scenes Program (New for DVD), Empire of Dreams: The Story of the Star Wars Trilogy (2005)

International Monitor Awards
Won: Documentaries – Director, Hollywood Aliens & Monsters (1998)

Student Academy Awards, US
Won: Documentary, I Remember Barbra (1981)

Filmography

References

External links

 

1955 births
2020 deaths
Writers from Schenectady, New York
Hamilton College (New York) alumni
Boston University College of Communication alumni
American entertainment industry businesspeople
Film producers from New York (state)
American male screenwriters
Television producers from New York (state)
Businesspeople from Schenectady, New York
Screenwriters from New York (state)
People from Niskayuna, New York